Matfen is a village and a civil parish in Northumberland, England, near the town of Hexham and the city of Newcastle upon Tyne. It is an example of a 19th-century planned estate village. It was the birthplace of the 7th Premier of British Columbia, William Smithe.

History
Matfen is a few miles north of Hadrian's Wall. About halfway between the two there is a prehistoric standing stone called Stob Stone, adjacent to Standing Stone Farmhouse. The stone is about seven feet high and decorated with cup marks.

The place-name Matfen is first attested in the Pipe Rolls for 1159, where it appears as Matefen. The name means Matta's fen. The civil parish was formed in 1955 from East Matfen, Fenwick, Ingoe, Kearsley, Ryal and West Matfen.

Landmarks

Matfen Hall now houses a hotel and country club. The Grade II* listed building was built about 1828 by Sir Edward Blackett to replace an earlier, 17th-century house.

The causeway is a Roman road, which starts at Port Gate on Hadrian's Wall, north of Corbridge, and extends  northwards across Northumberland to the mouth of the Tweed at Berwick-upon-Tweed.

Notable people
Thomas Bates (1775–1849), an eminent stockbreeder, was born in Matfen.
William Smithe (1842–1887), the 7th premier of British Columbia, was born in Matfen.
Lorna Hill (1902–1991), a writer of over 40 books for children, was the wife of the rector of Matfen.

References

External links

Tourist guide
Matfen Parish Council

 
Villages in Northumberland
Civil parishes in Northumberland